Jos van Aert (born 26 August 1962) is a Dutch former racing cyclist. He rode in six Grand Tours between 1989 and 1993. He is a cousin of the father of Belgian racing cyclist Wout van Aert.

References

External links
 

1962 births
Living people
Dutch male cyclists
Cyclists from Zundert
20th-century Dutch people